Revolt in the Reformatory (German: Revolte im Erziehungshaus) is a 1929 German silent drama film directed by Georg Asagaroff and starring Carl Balhaus, Vera Baranovskaya, Toni van Eyck. The film was based on a play by Peter Martin Lampel intended as an exposé of the youth justice system. The film was considered controversial, and was banned four times before its eventual release. The film's art direction was by Andrej Andrejew.

Cast
 Carl Balhaus as Fritz 
 Vera Baranovskaya as Fritz' mother
 Toni van Eyck as Fritz' sister 
 Wolfgang Zilzer as Hans 
 Peter Wolff as Erwin 
 Julius E. Herrmann as Direktor 
 Hugo Werner-Kahle as Hausvater 
 Renate Müller as Hausvater's daughter
 Oskar Homolka as Erzieher 
 Rudolf Platte as Erziehungsgehilfe 
 Veit Harlan as Kurt 
 Ilse Stobrawa as Lucie 
 Willy Clever   
 Friedrich Gnaß

References

Bibliography
 Kreimeier, Klaus. The Ufa Story: A History of Germany's Greatest Film Company, 1918-1945. University of California Press, 1999.

External links

1929 films
1929 drama films
Films of the Weimar Republic
German silent feature films
German drama films
Films directed by Georg Asagaroff
German films based on plays
German black-and-white films
Silent drama films
1920s German films
1920s German-language films